Teuchern is a town in the Burgenlandkreis district, in Saxony-Anhalt, Germany. It is situated approximately 10 km southeast of Weißenfels. On 1 January 2011 it absorbed the former municipalities Deuben, Gröben, Gröbitz, Krauschwitz, Nessa, Prittitz and Trebnitz. These 7 former municipalities and Teuchern proper are now Ortschaften or municipal divisions of the town Teuchern.

Sons and daughters of the town
 Reinhard Keiser, composer, (1674-1739)
 Johann Christian Schieferdecker, organist and composer, (1679-1732)
 Peter Meyer, keyboardist and saxophonist of the Puhdys, (born 1940 in Wildschütz)
 Jürgen Pahl, football goalkeeper, (born 1956)

References

 
Towns in Saxony-Anhalt
Burgenlandkreis